Casca is a series of historical fantasy novels created by author Barry Sadler in 1979. The stories revolve around the exploits of Casca Rufio Longinus, the Roman legionary who drove the Holy Lance into the side of Jesus Christ on Golgotha. As a result of this action, Casca is cursed with immortality, and he is to wander the Earth aimlessly, always as a soldier, until the Second Coming. The character is loosely based on the Longinus legend of Christianity.

Sadler wrote some of the early novels in the series while the others were assigned to ghostwriters. When Sadler died in 1989, the series was handed off to other writers. Two subsequent novels, The Liberator and The Defiant, were written by Paul Dengelegi. The current author, Tony Roberts, has written every new entry in the series since 2006, excluding Immortal Dragon and The Outlaw, which were written by Michael B. Goodwin. Immortal Dragon and The Outlaw were removed from the series in 2013 over allegations of plagiarism. An unauthorized audiobook, Casca: The Outcast, was written by Paul Dengelegi in 2004.

Characters

Casca Rufio Longinus 
Casca Rufio Longinus grew up in Etruria in the village of Falerno. His family died of plague, and he enlisted into the 7th Legion at either Messilia or Livorno. He joined the 10th Legion and was sent to Jerusalem where he was assigned to the execution detail for three prisoners, one of which was Jesus.

At Golgotha, Casca stabbed Jesus with his spear in an attempt to relieve Jesus of his pain and suffering. Jesus condemned Casca by saying, "Soldier, you are content with what you are. Then that you shall remain until we meet again. As I go now to My Father, you must one day come to Me." As Jesus died, blood from his wound trickled down Casca's spear and onto his hand, and Casca unknowingly tasted it after wiping sweat from his mouth, causing his body to convulse in pain. Later, Casca was stabbed in the stomach by his superior officer in a fight over an Armenian dancer. A mortally wounded Casca killed the superior officer and was promptly arrested and imprisoned, but by morning he was nearly healed. He then discovered that he cannot age, and that he is immortal, though he can feel all pain inflicted on his body. While his wounds heal completely, his body accumulates countless scars over the centuries. 

For the rest of the series, Casca is seen fighting in numerous wars, having been cursed to remain a soldier until the Second Coming. He fights for many sides of many nationalities, such as the Wehrmacht, the Confederate States Army, the French Foreign Legion, the Byzantine Empire, and the Red Army. He is often depicted as a mercenary. Casca is loyal to the Roman Empire and the Byzantine Empire, and he often fights against the Ottomans. One of his main adversaries is the Brotherhood of the Lamb. 

Over the course of the series, Casca meets numerous famous historical figures, such as Niccolò Machiavelli, Adolf Hitler, Attila the Hun, Blackbeard, Genghis Khan, Marco Polo, Robert E. Lee, George Washington, and Muhammad, among others.

Julius Goldman
Julius Goldman was a surgeon in the United States Army with the rank of Major, stationed at the 8th Field Hospital in Nha Trang during the Vietnam War. He first meets Casca in The Eternal Mercenary when the latter was brought into the hospital with multiple fatal injuries he should not have survived. Dr. Goldman discovered Casca's immortality and decided to become his biographer and chronicler. He is often visited by Casca for updates on his life and experiences throughout the ages. Dr. Goldman later leaves the Army and establishes his own practice. As Goldman ages, he introduces Casca to Danny Landries, the son of one of his former army comrades. Danny first meets Casca in Devil's Horseman and takes over from Goldman as his biographer.

The Brotherhood of the Lamb
The Brotherhood of the Lamb is a fanatical militant religious sect and the main antagonists of the series. It is run by the Inner Circle, the sect's hierarchy, composed of an elder and twelve "brothers". They preach force and power over traditional virtues of piety and compassion. The Brotherhood worships the Holy Lance, which forms the central focus at prayers. On holy days, the Brotherhood recreates the crucifixion in a reenactment involving the killing of one of the brothers, who has been selected to act the part of Jesus, using the Holy Lance.

The Brotherhood was founded by Izram, a man who proclaimed himself the thirteenth Disciple in the wake of Jesus's death, supposedly as a result of Casca stabbing him with the Holy Lance. Izram purchased the Holy Lance from some of Casca's comrades as a relic and symbol for the events on Golgotha. Izram then went into the wilderness for forty days before a revelation came to him that when Jesus returned at the Second Coming, he would meet Casca. The Brotherhood keeps Casca in their sights until the Second Coming; though they may hate Casca for his actions at Golgotha, they must not prevent him from meeting Jesus. They occasionally inflict severe pain on Casca, such as an elder cutting Casca's hand off or an acolyte arranging to burn Casca at the stake. In The Sentinel, Elder Gregory murders Casca's adopted son, Demos, and his wife, Ireina, for which Casca crucifies Gregory to death. Casca was also a prisoner of the Brotherhood in The Cursed and Panzer Soldier.

Notable real-life historical figures depicted as elders of the Brotherhood of the Lamb include Heinrich Himmler and Hassan al-Sabah.

Publication history
Casca is not written in chronological order, with many later novels being sequels or prequels to earlier ones. Immortal Dragon and The Outlaw are not considered canon entries in the series.  

A similar popular historical fiction parallel may be found in the Harry Flashman series in which a skilled man-at-arms and rascal raconteur of the 19th Century finds himself in parlous combat in distant lands but always manages to survive to reappear in another novel.  Unlike Casca, Harry Flashman ages normally.

Other Countries and Languages

 UK

Beginning in 1984, Star Book, a paperback division of W. H. Allen & Company, published The Eternal Mercenary, God of Death, and The Warlord. These were the only titles printed.

 Sweden

Only the first eleven titles of the series were printed by Swedish publisher Popular Pocket, beginning in 1983.

Audiobook
In 2004, former Casca author Paul Dengelegi wrote an unauthorized non-canon story titled Casca: The Outcast. 

The story follows Casca as a prizefighter in Victorian era England with acquaintances Ike and Ulysses. After an encounter with police and a slave trader selling a female slave to a wealthy man, Casca is shot, impaled on a bayonet, and placed on a prison hulk where fights are staged between prisoners (including Ike and Ulysses, led by Scottish prisoner Simon) for the vessel's captain. Eventually, Ulysses kills the captain and orders the female slave to be freed. The prison hulk arrives in Tasmania, where Casca becomes famous as Australia's champion prizefighter. While on a ship to the United States, the ship Casca and his acquaintances are on is attacked by Royal Marines who mistake their ship for pirates, and Ike is killed while Casca is mortally wounded. The story ends with Ulysses substituting Casca's coffin for one full of rocks and hiding Casca's body from the burial party. 

Dengelegi contracted with Americana Audio to have it published as a three-disc audiobook CD. This was subsequently withdrawn in 2006 following the closure of Americana Audio.

E-books
From January 2014, the series was put into e-book format, and all existing books in the series up to 2014 (with the exception of The Liberator, The Defiant, Immortal Dragon and The Outlaw) were available in Kindle format by June 2014.

See also 
 Wandering Jew

References

External links
 Official Casca website 

Series of books
Novelistic portrayals of Jesus
War novels set in the Roman Empire
Depictions of Jesus in literature
Fiction about curses
Christianity in fiction
Book series introduced in 1979
Historical fantasy novels
American fantasy novel series